Frindsbury TQ744697  is a parish on the River Medway, on the opposite bank to Chatham Dockyard in Kent, England. It was a centre of ship building before 1820, building at least six 74 gun third rate ships of the line and many smaller vessels. From 1820, until recent times, the ship yards built over 100 Thames sailing barges. Shipbuilding has stopped but in 2006, one yard was still active in ship repair.

Ships

Quarry House Yard
Edward Greaves and Nicholson set up at the Quarry House yard in c.1745. The full list of ships built is unknown but two of the later ones were:
1785 —32 gun frigate was part of a squadron off the coast of Genoa in 1794 under the command of Captain Horatio Nelson.
1786 —74 gun designed by Sir Thomas Slade. Laid down in 1783, she was launched on 6 October 1786 and commissioned on 19 July 1790. Nicknamed the "Billy Ruffian". She destroyed the French flagship L'Orient at the Battle of the Nile. Fought at Trafalgar. On 15 July 1815 she received the surrender of Napoleon Bonaparte. She was renamed Captivity and served as a prison hulk off Sheerness. She was sold to breakers at Plymouth for £4030 and broken up in 1834. The construction of the Bellerophon features in a poem by the American Imagist poet Amy Lowell.

Josiah and Thomas Brindley, leased the Quarry House yard. The first ship was launched from here in 1794. They expanded, built a new yard which became the entrance to the Thames and Medway Canal, then a third shipyard further down river. They built no more ships for the Navy after the Napoleonic War. However they did continue shipbuilding. In 1821 they built the McQueen East India Man and in 1825 the British Steam and Navigation Company contracted them to build a steamship. When the Brindleys were declared bankrupt in 1826
they lost their shipyards and all their other businesses. It had been thought that Josiah and Thomas Brindley were nephews of Lord Nelson but the Nelson family has said there is no relationship.

1794 —16 gun
1794 —12 gun
1794 —12 gun
1803 —36 gun – commissioned in September 1803, and wrecked 10 December 1803.
1804 —12 gun
1804 —12 gun
1805 —38 gun
1806 —38 gun – Launched 5 May 1806, HMS Shannon, commanded by Captain Philip Broke, received the surrender of the USS Chesapeake in Boston Bay on 1 June 1813, after a fight of 15 minutes.
1807 —74 gun
1808 —10 gun
1809 —18 gun
1809 —18 gun
1810 —74 gun
1811 —74 gun
1811  transport
1813 —36 gun
1813 —36 gun
1813 —20 gun
1814 —20 gun
1814 —26 gun
1814 —26 gun

Wilson and Co
1794 —16 gun
1796 —18 gun
1797 —12 gun
1797 —12 gun

John Pelham
1807 —36 gun
1808 —10 gun
1808 —10 gun
1809 —18 gun
1809 —18 gun
1812 —20 gun
1812 —58 gun

John King of Upnor
1801 —10 gun
1801 —10 gun
1801 —10 gun
1801 —10 gun
1801 —10 gun
1809 —18 gun
1809 —18 gun
1809 —74 gun third rate ship of the line.
1810 —10 gun
1810 —12 gun
1810 —Cutter
1810  - merchant ship that twice transported convicts to Van Diemen's Land
1812 —18 gun
1812 —18 gun
1812 —74 gun
1813 —36 gun
1814 —20 gun

Barge Building 

Frindsbury was an important centre for building of Thames sailing barges, using the land vacated by the shipbuilders. Barges were needed for many reasons; on the Medway it was for cement, brick and lime.

Curel's
In c. 1820 the lease of Quarry Yard, (Curel's Lower Yard), passed to John Curel. George H. Curel took over the business around 1870. He expanded the yard in 1887 leasing the yard by Strood Basin (Curel's Upper Yard).

Other families ran yards in Frindsbury, often they had other yards in Rochester.

Little
William Burgess Little
James Little
Gill
Gill Family, George Gill, of Cheetham Gill and Company. Canal shipyard.

London and Rochester Barge Co
LRTC- Crescent Shipping- Canal Road, this yard was still operating in 2006, being used for ship repair.

List of Barges
Here are some Frindsbury-built barges grouped by their owners. From 1870 to 1990 the Register of Shipping shows just over 100 Frindsbury Built Barges. 

Phoenix Portland Cement Company, Frindsbury.
Hawk—43 ton
Cerf—58 ton
Phoenix—51 ton

William Tingey
Robert Bladen—33 ton
Eliza—41 ton

Formby Cement Company, Whitewall Creek, Frindsbury
Sara—39 ton
Pink—43 ton
Queen—43 ton
Neptune—40 ton
Whitewall—37 ton
Vauxhall—40 ton
Eclipse—39 ton
Margaret Louise—45 ton
Ella Vicars—43 ton

Burham Brick, Lime and Cement Company
James—42 ton
John—40 ton
Ann—40 ton
Varnes—41 ton
The Gun—44 ton
William—41 ton

Peter Bros Ltd. Cement Works Burham
John—38 ton
William—39 ton
Overcomer—44 ton
Monkwood—46 ton
Ninety Nine—57 ton

Trenchmann Weekes Company Halling
John Tinworth—43 ton
William and Sarah—41 ton
George—45 ton
Ambrose—40 ton
Bella—35 ton
Edward and William—40 ton
Stratford—42 ton

West Kent Portland Cement Company (Margretts)
Stanley Margretts—44 ton
Cecil Margretts—46 ton
Harold Margretts—45 ton

Imperial Portland Cement Company
Gundulph—44 ton

John Blazey White, Gillingham
Sarah—38 ton
Flower of Kent—44 ton

Queenborough Cement Company
Trent—42 ton

Solomon Brice and Sons, Rainham and Hoo
Ada Mary—41 ton
Alumina—60 ton
Mosquito—40 ton
William Bennet—42 ton

Eastwoods (Medway brickmakers)
1845 George and Eliza
1852 Frederick and Mary Ann
1857 Ann and Frances
1862 Arthur and Eliza
1872 Onward
1876 Atlanta
1879 Hawk
1881 Banff
1884 Plover
1886 Snipe

References

External links
 18th Century Naval Database
 Frindsbury Extra Parish Council
 Arethusa Venture Centre
 Medway Yacht Club
 Upnor Castle
 Upnor Residents Society
 Medway City Council
 Kent Association of Parish Councils

Frindesbury

Shipbuilding in England